Taito Power Goal (aka Taito Cup Finals and Hat Trick Hero 95 in the US and Japan) is a side scrolling arcade soccer game released by Taito in 1994. It features digitalized players, referees, cameramen, and a streaker.

Teams

Gameplay

Like most arcade soccer games, the gameplay is fast-paced with little planning for tactics or positioning. The player picks an international team and nominates a "star player" or "Captain". Every team seemingly has the same abilities as one another, but the star player on each team is quicker, has a more powerful shot, and appears different from the rest of the team.

Players can tackle for the ball in various ways; sliding, performing a flying kick on an opponent, sweeping the legs of another player, slamming them to the floor, and more. The referee is very lenient in calling fouls (but when he does it usually results in a card) and can be knocked out himself for a few seconds, either by hitting him with the ball or tackling him.

Depending on how many credits the player uses in one game, their team is able to perform a special move. The special moves are selected when the ball goes out of play. The special moves include "Super Shot" and "Hyper Shot" which, when selected, sets the ball on fire and pushes the goalie into the net if he attempts to save it. In certain playing conditions, these special moves can be made. Both allow the Captain of the team to make the special move if passed to him. The score dictates which shot can be made: A free "Hyper Shot" can be made if the score is tied (with the exception of being tied at 0-0) and there are less than 10 seconds left. A free "Super Shot" can be made if the score is 0-0,  if a player is winning or losing, and if the time left is less than 30 seconds.

If the player wins the three initial games, they are able to change their team kit colors (their team then becomes known as "personal").

On occasion, a streaker or a dog will interrupt the game and run onto the pitch when the ball goes out of play.

Reception 
In Japan, Game Machine listed Taito Power Goal on their January 1, 1995 issue as being the most-successful arcade game of the month.

References

1994 video games
Arcade video games
Association football video games
Sega Saturn games
Taito arcade games
Video games developed in Japan